is a Japanese footballer currently playing as a midfielder for Roasso Kumamoto.

Career statistics

Club
.

Notes

References

External links

1997 births
Living people
Association football people from Hiroshima Prefecture
Ritsumeikan University alumni
Japanese footballers
Association football midfielders
J2 League players
J3 League players
Roasso Kumamoto players